Tony Nocita (born 9 November 1963) is a former professional Canadian soccer player who currently plays for Sons of Italy Lions SC.

He has been inducted into the Manitoba Sports Hall of Fame in 2003. The Winnipeg Fury's 1992 Mita Cup winning team will be inducted into the Manitoba Sports Hall of Fame in 2008.

Club career
Nocita played for the Winnipeg Fury of the Canadian Soccer League beginning in 1987, and was a member of the 1992 Championship team. He served as the team captain for the Fury in 1993 during the team's run in the Canadian National Soccer League. In 1994, he played in the American Professional Soccer League with the Toronto Rockets.

International career
Nicknamed Chita, he made his debut for Canada in an October 1987 friendly match against Honduras. He went on to earn 8 caps, all friendlies, scoring no goals.

His final international was an April 1992 game against China.

Coaching career
He has coached Sons of Italy Lions SC for several years as well as Calgary Storm.

Honours
Canadian Soccer League: 1
 1992

References

External links
Player profile - Sons of Italy Lions

1963 births
Living people
Soccer players from Winnipeg
Association football defenders
Canadian soccer players
Canada men's international soccer players
Winnipeg Fury players
Hamilton Steelers (1981–1992) players
Toronto Rockets players
Canadian Soccer League (1987–1992) players
Canadian National Soccer League players
American Professional Soccer League players